Rachel Mason is an American filmmaker whose work includes performance art, music, films and multimedia projects.

Early life and education
Mason was born in Los Angeles, California, to Karen and Barry Mason. She has an older brother, Micah, and a younger brother, Josh. Her mother was initially a journalist and her father worked as a special effects engineer in the film industry. When her parents got into financial difficulties in the mid-1970s, they got jobs distributing porn magnate Larry Flynt's Hustler magazine as well as gay porn publications. In 1982, Mason's parents took over the gay porn bookshop Circus of Books in West Hollywood, without telling their children what they did for a living. They also produced gay porn videos, starring Jeff Stryker.

Mason attended Wonderland Avenue Elementary, Los Angeles Center for Enriched Studies (LACES) and Cleveland High School in Reseda. Mason received a BFA in art from UCLA and an MFA from Yale University. In New York she worked as an assistant to video and performance artist Joan Jonas.

Performance art works

On January 20, 2017, Mason's character FutureClown performed a live streamed lip-synch Los Angeles Contemporary Exhibitions of President Trump's inaugural address as he was delivering it on national television. In 2013, FutureClown lip-synched a full 13 hour filibuster speech delivered by Senator Rand Paul.

Mason's earliest works included performances and centered around the body and architecture. As an undergraduate, Mason scaled the eight-story (now demolished) UCLA art building dressed as her fictional character, Terrestrial Being. This piece represents one of a series of performances for video focused on this character.

Between 2004 and 2010, Mason staged performances where she transformed into political leaders singing selections of works from her two Songs of the Ambassadors albums. Ranging from Manuel Noriega to Saddam Hussein. For the research into these songs, Mason conducted interviews with Ramsey Clark, former U.S. Attorney General who provided insight into some of the political leaders such as Fidel Castro, Saddam Hussein, Manuel Noriega, with whom she struck up a correspondence from his prison cell in Florida.

Her performances often included dancers and collaborations with musicians and guest artists. Performances occurred at the Park Avenue Armory (New York), Museum of Contemporary Art in Detroit (MOCAD), JMOCA in Los Angeles (Justin Hansch's Museum of Contemporary Art), and Kunsthalle Zürich.

Sculpture

While a student at Yale University, she created Kissing President Bush which was featured on the cover of the New York Times Art Section during the Republican National Convention held in New York, in 2004. In this sculptural work, the artist depicts herself kissing President George W. Bush.

Between 2006 and 2010, Mason created a collectible set of porcelain figurines of the various political figures involved in conflicts during her lifetime. In each conflict she included herself as an imagined ambassador.

In 2014, Mason created an exhibition of polymer clay doll sculptures with mirrored bodies, of female identified artists. The series, Starseeds, was presented first at Envoy Enterprises gallery in New York and then LTD Gallery in Los Angeles.

Musical works

In 2016, Mason released Das Ram, an album of eight synth based pop songs on the Los Angeles label, Cleopatra Records.
 
In 2013, the soundtrack to her film The Lives of Hamilton Fish was released as an album of 21 songs.

In 2012, Mason released an album with her band Little Band of Sailors which featured an original album cover made by John Baldessari, her mentor and teacher.

Mason released two albums of songs whose lyrics imagine being inside the minds of various political leaders. These albums, called The Ambassadors, Vol. I and Vol. II include songs written in collaboration with guest writers, artists and musicians including Josephine Foster, Jennifer Herrema, John Knuth, Julian Hoeber, Emory Holmes III, Sarah Lehrer-Graiwer.  Mason performed at art institutions, and which entailed costume changes where she morphed into leaders such as Saddam Hussein, Mobutu Sese Seko, Deng Xiaoping, and Jimmy Carter.

Films

Her debut feature film The Lives of Hamilton Fish is a musical art film with no dialogue. Mason often performed the entire soundtrack live in front of an audience while touring the film to museums and festivals. The film's story is based on a true coincidence Mason discovered. Two obituaries of two men, both named Hamilton Fish, were printed on the front page of a newspaper from January 16, 1936. Hamilton Fish (aka Albert Fish) had been a serial killer while Hamilton Fish II had been a statesman.  The latter was a descendant of 18th century politician Alexander Hamilton, who was killed in a duel by Aaron Burr; a large part of the film was shot on location at the Morris–Jumel Mansion where Burr once lived. The film also portrays one of the first known psychics, The White Crow, aka Leonora Piper.

The Lives of Hamilton Fish premiered at London's Raindance Film Festival in 2015, and Mason performed with the film as a live performance at museums including LACMA, Art in General, Henry Art Gallery, Corcoran Gallery, Albany Institute of History and Art, The Horse Hospital (London), Pineapple Underground Film Festival (Hong Kong), and Night Gallery (Los Angeles).

Mason's 2019 documentary feature film Circus of Books was acquired by Netflix and executive produced by Ryan Murphy. It is based on the story of the historic gay landmark Circus of Books, a book and magazine store that her parents ran from 1982 until 2019. The film had its world premiere at the Tribeca Film Festival on April 26, 2019 and was the opening night gala presentation at the 2019 Outfest film festival. It was available for streaming on Netflix on April 22, 2020.

"Rachel's art is fluid — it's always easing in and out of different forms. She is a songwriter and performer; she's an actress, of a sort, who performs as if channeling the poetic inner souls of controversial leaders like Fidel Castro and Manuel Noriega." -- Claudine Ise

External links
Official website

References 

21st-century American women artists
Artists from Los Angeles
University of California, Los Angeles alumni
American women sculptors
American performance artists
Year of birth missing (living people)
Living people
Yale University alumni